Charlotte Barnes may refer to:

 Charlotte Mary Sanford Barnes (1818–1863), American actress and playwright
 A character from the film Bandslam